Sloane, New South Wales is a small locality whose main reason for being is its railway station and wheat silo. The area was named after Alexander Sloane, one of the pioneers of the Riverina, who owned the grazing properties Savernake Station and Mulwala Station.

Transport 
Sloane is located on the Victorian Oaklands railway line and as such the railway was constructed to broad gauge. In 2008 a decision was taken to gauge convert the North East railway line from broad gauge to standard gauge. Subsequently it was decided to also convert the Oaklands line. The conversion was completed in 2009.

References

External links 
 Sloane Rail Siding Photos

Towns in the Riverina